Neiland is a surname. Notable people with the surname include:

Brendan Neiland (born 1941), English artist
Larisa Neiland (born 1966), Latvian tennis player
John Neiland, 16th century Anglican priest in Ireland